is a 2005 Japanese animated film based on Masashi Kishimoto's manga and anime franchise, written by Hirotsugu Kawasaki and Yuka Miyata. It was released in theaters in Japan on August 6, 2005. 

Unlike Ninja Clash in the Land of Snow, Legend of the Stone of Gelel became a direct-to-video film in the United States. It aired on Cartoon Network on July 26, 2008 and was released to DVD on July 29, 2008. The film is set after episode 145. The theme song "Ding! Dong! Dang!" is performed by TUBE.

Plot 
At a desolated beach, a night-time battle rages between the sand ninjas and bulky, robot-like, armored warriors. Gaara and the group of sand ninjas gain the upper-hand and when the remaining warriors begin to retreat back into the ocean, they shoot flares into the night to reveal a large warship waiting just offshore.

Meanwhile, Naruto Uzumaki, Shikamaru Nara and Sakura Haruno are on a mission to recover a lost pet ferret when they too are attacked by the armored warriors as well as a mysterious knight named Temujin. After a short battle, both Temujin and Naruto are blasted off a nearby cliff. Shikamaru and Sakura run to the edge to see if they can spot their friend, when suddenly a massive machine, like a giant moving cathedral, plows through the forest and comes to rest not far away. Naruto and Temujin wake up to find themselves in a moving caravan led by Kahiko and Emina. 

Luckily the ferret, Nerugui, has survived the fall and has taken a liking to Temujin much to the chagrin of Kahiko whom Naruto discovers is the person whom ordered the mission. Shikamaru investigates the cathedral and discovers a room filled with pods containing human beings. He witnesses two people, Kamina and Ranke associates to Temujin, appear to activate the pods which seem to use the humans to place souls on each armored, soldier body. Temujin leaves the caravan to return to his own part with Naruto in tow. Back at the cathedral, Temujin introduces Naruto to a man named Master Haido. 

Haido informs Naruto and Temujin about the Gelel Stone, a mysterious powerful mineral controlling the traveling caravan which the annihilated clan lost it. Haido plans to get the stone in order to make the world in peace. Naruto and Temujin head to the beach, where Gaara defeats Ranke and Kamina flees, while Shikamaru and Sakura save Kahiko from Fugai. Temujin recalls his past memory, before Shikamaru restrains him and reunites with the others. They interrogate with Temujin, but he and Kahiko leave the caravan. At the Gelel Mine, Naruto and friends confront Haido for sacrificing anyone. 

As Haido and Naruto pursue Kahiko and Temujin below the platform elevator, Shikamaru, Sakura and Kankuro defeat Kamina and Fugai. At the Chamber of Sealing, Haido informs Temujin that he killed his parents. After destroying Teumjin's stone, Haido tries to use his power of the real one to kill him, but the sacrificing soldiers arrive to save the repentant Temujin. As Naruto uses the green and orange  to destroy the stone and defeat Haido, Naruto, Temujin and Kahiko discover the mine losing control. Temujin uses the Space-Time Hole to destroy the mine and Naruto saves him.

In the mid-credits scene, the recovered Temujin and the children set sail, and say goodbye to Naruto and allies.

Cast

References

External links 
 
 

2005 films
2005 anime films
2000s Japanese-language films
Japanese sequel films
Legend of the Stone of Gelel
Toho animated films
Viz Media anime